In abstract algebra, the triple product property is an identity satisfied in some groups.

Let  be a non-trivial group.

 

It plays a role in research of fast matrix multiplication algorithms.

References

 Henry Cohn, Chris Umans. A Group-theoretic Approach to Fast Matrix Multiplication. . Proceedings of the 44th Annual IEEE Symposium on Foundations of Computer Science, 11–14 October 2003, Cambridge, MA, IEEE Computer Society, pp. 438–449.

Properties of groups